Lumière is a French drama film written and directed by Jeanne Moreau. The semi-autobiographical film is about the friendship between four actresses. It is credited as being one of the first films to focus on female friendship.

Plot 
Sarah is an actress who is nearing 40. She invites Laura, her best friend of the past sixteen years, along with two other women, Caroline and Julienne, to a vacation retreat in Provence. Each woman is at a critical point in her life; Sarah has broken up with her longtime partner, while Laura is pregnant but her husband is carrying on an affair with another woman. Caroline is in an unhappy relationship, and Julienne is being pursued by an American actor.

Cast

Reception 
Lumière received critical acclaim. Critic Roger Ebert wrote positively of the film, commenting "as the strands of [Moreau's] story become clear and we begin to know the characters, the movie grows into a simple and strong emotional statement."

In a retrospective review, Richard Brody of The New Yorker wrote, Working with the cinematographer Ricardo Aronovich, [Moreau] develops a gliding, peering, shifting aesthetic to match the glossy surfaces with which she conveys shuddering depths of feeling. The camera roves around the actors, capturing the agitation within their controlled gestures, suggesting the elegance of leisure and luxury within which high adventures of passion, pleasure, and power—of self-creation and self-definition—play out.

Accolades

References

External links
 
 Lumière at Rotten Tomatoes
 Lumière at AllMovie
 Lumière at BFI

French romantic drama films
1976 romantic drama films
1976 films
Films directed by Jeanne Moreau
Films set in Provence-Alpes-Côte d'Azur
1970s female buddy films
Films about actors
French female buddy films
1970s French films